Misbehaving may refer to:

Misbehaving: The Making of Behavioral Economics, a book by the economist Richard Thaler
"Misbehaving" (song), a song by Labrinth
Misbehavin', a 1988 album by Joanna Dean
"Misbehavin'", a song by Pentatonix from Pentatonix (album)
"Misbehavin'", song by Thalía from Thalía (English-language album)